South Pembrokeshire Hospital is a community hospital in Pembroke Dock, Pembrokeshire, Wales. It is managed by the Hywel Dda University Health Board.

History
The hospital was originally built as a Royal Naval Hospital in 1902 and was expanded by the Royal Air Force during the Second World War. In November 2013 the Minor Injury Unit was closed and staff relocated to Withybush General Hospital.

Services
The hospital has 35 inpatient beds and five social care beds. It operates various rehabilitation, outpatient services.

References

Hospitals established in 1902
Hospitals in Pembrokeshire
NHS hospitals in Wales
1902 establishments in Wales
Hywel Dda University Health Board